Sceloporus occidentalis bocourtii, commonly known as the Coast Range fence lizard, is a subspecies of Sceloporus occidentalis, the Western fence lizard.

Geographic range
This taxon, S. o. bocourtii, is found in the state of California, from Sonoma County south to Santa Barbara County.

Taxonomy
The subspecies S. o. bocourtii is in the family Phrynosomatidae, North American spiny lizards.

Etymology
The subspecific name, bocourtii, is in honor of French herpetologist Marie Firmin Bocourt.

See also
Great Basin fence lizard
Island fence lizard
Northwestern fence lizard
Sierra fence lizard

References

External links
Hogan, C. Michael (2008). "Western fence lizard (Sceloporus occidentalis)". Globaltwitcher, ed. Nicklas Stromberg .
ITIS report: Sceloporus occidentalis bocourtii (1996).

Further reading
Bell, Edwin L. (1954). "A Preliminary Report on the Subspecies of the Western Fence Lizard, Sceloporus occidentalis, and its Relationships to the Eastern Fence Lizard, Sceloporus undulatus ". Herpetologica 10 (1): 31–36. (Sceloporus occidentalis bocourtii, new combination).
Boulenger GA (1885). Catalogue of the Lizards in the British Museum (Natural History). Second Edition. Volume II. Iguanidæ ... London: Trustees of the British Museum (Natural History). (Taylor and Francis, printers). xiii + 497 pp. + Plates I-XXIV. ("Sceloporus undulatus Var. bocourtii ", new variation, p. 229).
Smith, Hobart M.; Brodie, Edmund D., Jr. (1982). Reptiles of North America: A Guide to Field Identification. New York: Golden Press. 240 pp. (Sceloporus occidentalis bocourtii, p. 122).

Sceloporus
Fauna of the California chaparral and woodlands
Reptiles of the United States